The Bridegroom is a short piece of fiction by Angela Carter. It does not appear in the volume of Carter's collected short fictions Burning Your Boats: The Collected Short Stories. It can be found in the anthology Lands of Never (ed. Maxim Jakubowski, Allen & Unwin 1983), reprinted from the periodical Bananas #13 1979.

References

Works by Angela Carter
1979 short stories